Óscar Cabral (born 18 November 1921) was a Portuguese water polo player. He competed in the men's tournament at the 1952 Summer Olympics.

References

External links
 

1921 births
Year of death missing
Portuguese male water polo players
Olympic water polo players of Portugal
Water polo players at the 1952 Summer Olympics